The Caucasian Mineral Waters is a group of spa resorts protected by government ecological region in the Russian Federation. It includes the towns of Pyatigorsk, Zheleznovodsk, Yessentuki, Kislovodsk, Kumagorsk (Mineral Waters), and resort location of Naguta.

The Caucasian Mineral Waters is a unique Russian resort complex that has no analogues on the European Asian continent. There are more than 115 sanatoriums, specializing in the treatment of various illnesses. This defined the Caucasian Mineral Waters as the main, composite, and versatile recreation area in Russia. This region is also famous for its beautiful landscape, mild climate, highly effective medicinal mud of Lake Tambukan, and unique mineral springs (about 300).

There are 118 spa resorts supplied with modern medical and diagnostic equipment, 26 tourist and hotel complexes, which are able to accommodate more than 40,000 guests at the same time.

History 

In 1913, more than 37,000 patients visited the Caucasian Mineral Waters. During this period, however, there were no medical institutions and the first sanatoriums only started to appear at the beginning of the 20th century.

During the Civil War, the place fell into decay. Only 7,000 people visited to cure their illnesses in 1922. However, in 1928, the number of patients increased to 90,000 people. During the Second World War, more than 900,000 wounded and sick people got medical treatment here.

By the year 1980, eighty-two sanatoriums and sixteen guesthouses were available for tourists. Nowadays, every year about one million people come here to get treatment.

Spa-resort base 
Specialists developed indications and contraindications to the medical treatment in the region of the Caucasian Mineral Waters – for adults, teenagers, and children. These indicators are developed in consideration of the character of natural medicinal properties available in the resorts as well as climatic and geographical features of the region and its influence on the health and illness of people.

Zheleznovodsk 
Resorts in Zheleznovodsk have two profiles: gastrointestinal tract disorders, kidney disease, and urinary tract disorders.

Sanatoriums  
 all sanatoriums of Zheleznovodsk resort
 sanatorium Bukovaya Roshcha
 sanatorium Gornyj Vozduh
 sanatorium Dubovaya Roshcha
 sanatorium Dubrava
 sanatorium Zdorov'e
 sanatorium 30-letiya Pobedy
 sanatorium Kirova
 sanatorium Tel'mana
 sanatorium Lesnoj
 sanatorium Mashuk Akva-Term
 sanatorium Plaza
 sanatorium Rus'
 sanatorium Beshtau
 sanatorium El'brus

Essentuki 

Resorts in Essentuki have two profiles: gastrointestinal tract disorders, kidney disease, and urinary tract disorders.

Sanatoriums 
 all sanatoriums of Essentuki resort
 sanatorium Istochnik
 sanatorium Centrosoyuza
 sanatorium Rus'
 sanatorium Niva
 sanatorium Istok"
 sanatorium Pavlova
 sanatorium SHahter
 sanatorium Sechenova
 sanatorium Rossiya
 sanatorium YUnost'
 sanatorium Kazahstan
 sanatorium Voronezh
 sanatorium Ukraina
 sanatorium Kalinina
 sanatorium ZHemchuzhina Kavkaza
 sanatorium Viktoriya
 sanatorium Dolina Narzanov
 sanatorium Celebnyj Klyuch
 sanatorium Andzhievskogo
 sanatorium Nadezhda
 sanatorium Metallurg
 sanatorium Moskva

Kislovodsk  

Resorts in Kislovodsk have two profiles: gastrointestinal tract disorders, kidney disease, and urinary tract disorders.

Sanatoriums 
 all sanatoriums of Kislovodsk resort
 sanatorium Viktoriya
 sanatorium Villa Arnest
 sanatorium Dzhinal
 sanatorium Dolina Narzanov
 sanatorium Zarya
 sanatorium Gor'kogo
 sanatorium Dimitrova
 sanatorium Kirova
 sanatorium Ordzhonikidze
 sanatorium Semashko
 sanatorium Kavkaz
 sanatorium Kolos
 sanatorium Krasnye kamni
 sanatorium Krepost'
 sanatorium Krugozor
 sanatorium Moskva
 sanatorium Narzan
 sanatorium Piket
 sanatorium Plaza
 sanatorium Rodnik
 sanatorium Solnechnyj
 sanatorium Celebnyj Narzan
 sanatorium Centrosoyuz

Pyatigorsk 
Base of medical treatment in Pyatigorsk sanatoriums is balneal-, mud-therapy.

Sanatoriums 
 all sanatoriums of Pyatigorsk resort
 sanatorium Galereya Palas
 sanatorium Don
 sanatorium Zori Stavropol'ya
 sanatorium Kirova
 sanatorium Lermontova
 sanatorium Mashuk
 sanatorium Pyatigorskij Narzan
 sanatorium Pyatigor'e
 sanatorium Rodnik
 sanatorium Runo
 sanatorium Tarhany
 sanatorium CVS
 sanatorium Beshtau
 sanatorium Bristol'
 sanatorium Inturist

References
 https://web.archive.org/web/20141127022349/http://pyatigorsk.org/ru/
 https://web.archive.org/web/20141119122232/http://adm-zheleznovodsk.ru/in/md/main

Spa towns in Russia
Tourist attractions in the Soviet Union